Tim Weissman (born 1970) is a clinical psychologist and ten-time world champion in the sport of professional Air Hockey. He is a major subject of the documentary Way of the Puck. He is credited for creating a move called the "circle drift." He has also been referred to as "The Kasparov of Air Hockey."

Footnotes

References 
Hageman, William. "Sometimes Air Hockey isn't just a game", Chicago Tribune, October 17, 2004.

External links 
Profile on "Air Hockey World"

Air hockey
1970 births
Living people
21st-century American psychologists